Larráinzar is one of the 119 municipalities of Chiapas, in southern Mexico. The municipal seat is the town of San Andrés Larráinzar.

As of 2010, the municipality had a total population of 20,349, up from 16,538 as of 2005. It covers an area of 171.04 km².

As of 2010, the town of Larráinzar (San Andrés Larráinzar) had a population of 2,364. Other than the town of Larráinzar, the municipality had 77 localities, none of which had a population over 1,000.

References

Municipalities of Chiapas